This is a list of games and applications, collectively known as DSiWare, for the Nintendo DSi handheld game console, available for download via the DSi Shop and unplayable on earlier DS models. An update released for the Nintendo 3DS in June 2011 added support for the Nintendo eShop service, which contained the DSi Shop's full library of DSiWare games (at the time) with the exception of certain games and applications. There were over 200 downloadable games available in North America as of August 2010. DSiWare games and applications typically have animated icons, but some of them, such as Bejeweled Twist, have static icons. Note that blank boxes in some columns represent currently unconfirmed or otherwise unknown information. (This list is incomplete and missing some titles and many release dates outside of North America.) Release dates are subject to change. The DSi Shop has ceased activity on March 31, 2017. Although DSiWare games and apps on the Nintendo eShop are currently not affected, the Wii U and 3DS eShops are scheduled for closure at some point during late March 2023.  The last DSiWare software title was Crazy Train which was released in the United States on January 28, 2016.

List of DSiWare games

There are  games released on the DSiWare platform.

List of DSiWare applications

There are  applications released on DSiWare.

List of DSiWare games that also have a physical release

There are  games released on the DSiWare platform.

See also
List of DSiWare games (North America)
List of DSiWare games (PAL region)
List of Nintendo 3DS games
List of Nintendo DS games
List of Nintendo Switch games
List of Virtual Console games
List of Wii games
List of Wii U software
List of WiiWare games

Notes

References

External links
Nintendo of Japan's DSiWare title list
Nintendo of the UK's DSiWare title list
Hudson Soft DSiWare game titles
WikiGames: The Video Game Wiki's Complete DSiWare List
Real Football 2010 (DSiWare) Game Profile | News, Reviews, Videos & Screenshots

DSiWare